Michael Alan Brannan (December 27, 1955 – January 8, 2013) was an American golfer.

Brannan was born in Salinas, California. He won the U.S. Junior Amateur in 1971, beating Robert Steele in the final, 4 and 3, to become the tournament's youngest champion, at 15 years, 8 months. His record stood for 20 years until broken by Tiger Woods in 1991 (15 years, 6 months). He also played on the winning 1977 Walker Cup team. He played college golf at Brigham Young University, where he was a four-time All-American, graduating in 1978. He was inducted into the BYU Hall of Fame in 1989.

Brannan turned professional in 1978 and played on the PGA Tour from 1979 to 1983. His best finish on tour was second place at the 1979 Houston Open, two strokes behind Wayne Levi. He won the 1979 Hassan II Golf Trophy, which would later become a European Tour event.

Brannan quit the tour after the 1983 season and became an equipment rep for Ping, a position he held until his death in 2013. He was reinstated as an amateur golf in the late 1980s and won the Northern California Senior Championship in 2012.

Amateur wins
1970 Junior World Golf Championships (Boys 13–14)
1971 U.S. Junior Amateur
1973 California State Amateur, Pacific Coast Amateur, NCGA Junior, NGGA Four-Ball (with Jim Latham)
1976 California State Amateur, NCGA Amateur Match Play
2012 NCGA Senior Championship

Professional wins
1973 California State Open (as an amateur)
1975 Utah Open
1979 Hassan II Golf Trophy
1981 Northern California Open

U.S. national team appearances
Walker Cup: 1977 (winners)

See also
1982 PGA Tour Qualifying School graduates

References

External links

American male golfers
BYU Cougars men's golfers
PGA Tour golfers
Amateur golfers
Golfers from California
1955 births
2013 deaths